Anokha Daaj Punjabi film is a 1981 Pakistani drama film.

Directed and produced by Aslam Dar, the film stars Sultan Rahi, Aasia, Waheed Murad, Sabiha Khanum and Sheikh Iqbal.

Cast

 Sultan Rahi
 Asiya
 Durdana Rehman
 Waheed Murad
 Sabiha Khanum
 Ilyas Kashmiri
 Tani
 Sheikh Iqbal
 Nasrullah Butt
 Rehan
 Saqi
 Altaf Hussain
 Shehla Gill
 Taya Barkat
 Fazal Haq
 Abbu Shah
 Rafiq

Track list
The soundtrack was composed by the musician Rafiq Ali, with lyrics by Waris Ludhianvi and sung by Mehnaz and Afshan.

Box office
Anokha Daaj got a status of a platinum jubilee film at box office.

References

External links
 

1980s action drama films
Pakistani action drama films
1981 films
Punjabi-language Pakistani films
1980s Punjabi-language films
1981 drama films